Outlaw is an album by War, released on RCA Victor Records in 1982.

This was War's first album for RCA.  Between this and the previous album on MCA, War released a single on LA Records, a company owned by their producer Jerry Goldstein: "Cinco de Mayo", which also appears on Outlaw, backed with "Don't Let No One Get You Down", an older track from Why Can't We Be Friends? (1975).

Alice Tweed Smith (vocals) had left the band since their previous album, reducing the group to eight members, although the cover only shows seven. Pat Rizzo isn't on the cover picture.  Assuming that composer credits indicate the lineup of each track (excluding producer Jerry Goldstein); on some tracks, Ron Hammon (drums) and Pat Rizzo (saxophone) are not credited.

Three more singles from the album were issued on RCA Victor: "You Got the Power" backed with "Cinco de Mayo", "Outlaw" backed with "I'm About Somebody", and "Just Because" backed with "The Jungle (medley)".  Also, "Baby It's Cold Outside" (not the popular 1940s song by Frank Loesser) was issued as a promotional single for seasonal music radio programming.  Therefore, every track on the album was also issued on a single, though some were probably edited.

The album was re-released on CD in 1995 with a different running order and the extended version of "Cinco de Mayo" added as a bonus track.

Charts

Singles

Track listing

Side one
"You Got the Power" (Allen, Brown, Goldstein, Jordan, Oskar, Rabb, Scott) – 5:41
"Outlaw" (Allen, Brown, Goldstein, Hammon, Jordan, Oskar, Rabb, Scott) – 5:02
"The Jungle (Medley)" (Allen, Brown, Goldstein, Hammon, Jordan, Oskar, Rabb, Scott) - 8:06
"Beware It's a Jungle Out There" – 2:30
"The Street of Walls" – 1:37
"The Street of Lights" – 1:59
"The Street of Now" – 2:40

Side two
"Just Because" (Papa Dee Allen, Harold Brown, Ron Hammon, Lonnie Jordan, Lee Oskar, Luther Rabb, Howard E. Scott) – 4:09
"Baby It's Cold Outside" (Allen, Brown, Hammon, Jordan, Oskar, Rabb, Pat Rizzo, Scott, Jerry Goldstein) – 5:51
"I'm About Somebody" (Allen, Brown, Goldstein, Jordan, Oskar, Rabb, Scott) – 5:34
"Cinco de Mayo" (Allen, Brown, Goldstein, Hammon, Jordan, Oskar, Rabb, Rizzo, Scott) – 3:59

1995 CD re-release

"Cinco de Mayo" (Allen, Brown, Goldstein, Hammon, Jordan, Oskar, Rabb, Rizzo, Scott) – 3:59
"Outlaw" (Allen, Brown, Goldstein, Hammon, Jordan, Oskar, Rabb, Scott) – 5:02
"The Jungle (Medley)" (Allen, Brown, Goldstein, Hammon, Jordan, Oskar, Rabb, Scott) - 8:06
"Just Because" (Papa Dee Allen, Harold Brown, Ron Hammon, Lonnie Jordan, Lee Oskar, Luther Rabb, Howard E. Scott) – 4:09
"Baby It's Cold Outside" (Allen, Brown, Hammon, Jordan, Oskar, Rabb, Pat Rizzo, Scott, Jerry Goldstein) – 5:51
"I'm About Somebody" (Allen, Brown, Goldstein, Jordan, Oskar, Rabb, Scott) – 5:34
"You Got the Power" (Allen, Brown, Goldstein, Jordan, Oskar, Rabb, Scott) – 5:41
"Cinco de Mayo" (Extended Version) (Allen, Brown, Goldstein, Hammon, Jordan, Oskar, Rabb, Rizzo, Scott) – 7:30

Personnel
War
Papa Dee Allen – percussion, lead and background vocals
Harold Brown – drums, percussion, background vocals
Ron Hammon – drums, percussion, background vocals
Lonnie Jordan – organ, piano, synthesizer, percussion, lead and background vocals
Lee Oskar – harmonicas
Luther Rabb – bass, lead and background vocals
Pat Rizzo – saxophones, flutes
Howard Scott – guitar, lead and background vocals

Technical personnel
Jerry Goldstein and Lonnie Jordon – producers
Chris Huston, John Fischbach – recording engineers
Bill Ravencraft – second engineer
Jef Sanders – mastering engineer
Tony King – cover concept
Mike Doud – art direction, design
Richard Arrindell – photography

References

1982 albums
War (American band) albums
RCA Records albums
Albums produced by Jerry Goldstein (producer)